Jozef Karika (born November 15, 1978, in Brezno) is a Slovak experimental publicist and writer. He studied history and philosophy at Matej Bel's University in Banská Bystrica. He is the author of the bestseller In the shadow of Mafia. He was awarded the Prize of Literary Fund (Cena Literárneho fondu).

As a reporter of a regional TV channel based in Ružomberok, he pointed to the case of Slovak Catholic priest Ján Ferenčík, who, despite his wartime admiration for Nazi dictator Adolf Hitler, was later celebrated by placing a commemorative plaque on the town hall in Ružomberok.

Work

Slovak books 
2007 - Mágia peňazí (Ikar)
2007 - K.P.M.P.Z. (Ikar)
2012 - Na smrť (Ikar)
2013 - Na smrť II (Bez milosti) (Ikar)
2014 - Strach (Ikar)
2015 - Tma (Ikar)
2015 - Čierna hra: Vláda mafie (Ikar)
2016 - Trhlina (Ikar)
2017 - Mafiánska trilógia: V tieni mafie, V tieni mafie II, Nepriateľ štátu2017 - Čierny rok: Vojna mafie2018 - Priepasť Czech books
2003 - Slovanská magie (Vodnář)
2005 - Zóny stínu (Vodnář)
2008 - Magie peněz (Vodnář)
2009 - Brány meonu (Vodnář)

 English books
2009 - Liber 767 vel Boeingus''

References

External links 
  
  Interview with Jozef Karika

Czech-language writers
1978 births
Living people
Slovak writers
English-language writers